Roger Bissière (22 September 1886 – 2 December 1964) was a French artist. He designed stained glass windows for Metz cathedral and several other churches.

Biography
Roger Bissière was born 22 September 1886 in Villeréal, Lot-et-Garonne. In 1901 the family moved to Bordeaux. His mother, Elisabeth Chastaignol, died 25 April 1902. In 1904 his father, Fernand Bissière, did not allow him to enter art school. Roger then travelled to Algeria. When he returned in 1905, he enrolled at the école des Beaux- Arts de Bordeaux where he studied with Paul François Quinsac until 1909. From September 1910 he studied with Gabriel Ferrier at the École des Beaux-Arts in Paris.

He married Catherine Lucie Lotte (nicknamed Mousse), 23 January 1919. Their son Marc-Antoine was born 15 July 1925.

Bissière published articles in the magazine L'Esprit Nouveau about Seurat (No. 1, 1920), Ingres (No. 4, 1921) and Corot (No. 9, 1921).

In 1936, Bissière was one of the artists who executed Robert and Sonia Delaunay's designs for the Exposition Internationale des Arts et Techniques dans la Vie Moderne. He participated in the first three documenta exhibitions of 1955, 1959 and 1964.

After he realised his eyesight was deteriorating he was diagnosed with glaucoma in 1939. By 1950 his peripheral vision was severely affected and he underwent surgery. This stopped him from going blind but did not improve his eyesight, and he complained his eyes tired more quickly when he was painting.

Roger Bissière died 2 December 1964 in Boissièrette, Lot.

Legacy
Rue Roger-Bissière (fr) in Paris is named in his honour.

Forgeries
Between 1985 and 1995 John Myatt produced a number of fake Roger Bissière paintings for John Drewe, a purveyor of forged art.

Notes and references

Further reading 
 
  Considerable material on forged Bissieres.

External links
 

20th-century French painters
20th-century French male artists
French male painters
1886 births
1964 deaths
People from Lot-et-Garonne
School of Paris
Art Informel and Tachisme painters